Thomas Percy may refer to:

Thomas Percy, 1st Earl of Worcester (1343–1403), English medieval nobleman
Thomas Percy (Pilgrimage of Grace) (1504–1537), executed as a leader of the Pilgrimage of Grace
Thomas Percy (fl. 1563), MP for Plympton Erle
Thomas Percy (died 1572), MP for Westmorland
Thomas Percy, 7th Earl of Northumberland (1528–1572), led the Rising of the North and was executed for treason, beatified by the Catholic Church
Thomas Percy, 1st Baron Egremont (1422–1460), son of Henry Percy, 2nd Earl of Northumberland and Lady Eleanor Neville
Thomas Percy (bishop of Norwich) (died 1369), Bishop of Norwich
Thomas Percy (Gunpowder Plot) (c.1560–1605), one of the conspirators in the Gunpowder Plot
Thomas Percy (bishop of Dromore) (1729–1811), Bishop of Dromore and collector of Percy's Reliques
Thomas George Percy (1704–1794), American cotton planter and settler of Alabama

See also 
 Percy